Lieutenant-General John Clitherow (13 December 1782 – 14 October 1852) was a British army officer and colonial administrator. He was briefly Deputy Governor-General of the Province of Canada in 1841.

Early life and family
Clitherow was born at Essendon, Hertfordshire, England in 1782, the son of Christopher Clitherow and Anne Jodrell. He was descended from Sir Christopher Clitherow, Member of Parliament (1628-1629) and Lord Mayor of London in 1635. The Clitherow family were wealthy London merchants throughout the 17th and 18th families, and owned Boston Manor in Brentford (now part of London), from 1670 onwards.

In 1809, Clitherow married Sarah Christie Burton, daughter of General Napier Christie Burton and granddaughter of General Gabriel Christie, who had served with the British Army in the Revolutionary War, afterwards settling in Lower Canada, where he acquired extensive land-holdings. Clitherow and his wife had one son, John Christie Clitherow, who eventually served in the Coldstream Guards.  However, the marriage ended when Clitherow divorced Sarah in 1819, by private Act of Parliament. In 1825, Clitherow married Millicent Pole of Gloucestershire.

Military career 

Clitherow enlisted in the British Army as an ensign in 1799.  He served in the Egyptian campaign of 1801, an expedition to Germany in 1805, and an expedition to the Netherlands in 1809.  He participated in the Peninsular War from 1810 to 1815, being wounded twice.  He was promoted to colonel in 1821, and to major-general in 1830.

In 1838, Clitherow was posted to British North America, to serve as commanding officer of the military district of Montreal. He was accompanied by his son, who served as his aide-de-camp.  Clitherow arrived in Montreal in March, 1838, shortly after the Lower Canada Rebellion had broken out in late 1837.

He served as an advisor to Lord Durham as a member of the Special Council that administered Lower Canada following the rebellion.

When the second rebellion broke out Clitherow commanded 3,000 regulars that marched on rebel headquarters.  He also presided over courts martial that prosecuted the rebels.

In 1841, he was transferred to Canada West to command British forces there.

Deputy Governor General 

The Governor General of the Province of Canada, Lord Sydenham, appointed him as Deputy Governor General. In that capacity, on 18 September 1841, Clitherow prorogued the first session of the first Parliament of the Province of Canada. Sydenham was unable to carry out his functions, as he had been badly injured by a fall from a horse. He died the day after Parliament was prorogued.

Clitherow remained the Deputy Governor General for six days, until the Commander-in-Chief of the British Army in Canada, Sir Richard Downes Jackson, was appointed as Administrator.

Retirement and death 
In 1842, Clitherow inherited the family estate, Boston Manor in Brentford, England.  He retired to England that year.

Clitherow died at Boston Manor in 1852.

References

External links 
 

1782 births
1852 deaths
British Army lieutenant generals
Members of the Special Council of Lower Canada
People from Essendon, Hertfordshire
Scots Guards officers
British Army personnel of the Napoleonic Wars
British Army personnel of the French Revolutionary Wars